In chemistry and materials science, linear chain compounds are materials composed of one-dimensional arrays of metal-metal bonded molecules or ions.  Such materials exhibit anisotropic electrical conductivity.

Examples
Most examples are composed of square planar complexes. Thus, upon crystallization, molecules of  stack with  distances of about 326 pm. Classic examples include Krogmann's salt and Magnus's green salt. The otherwise ordinary complex  gives an electrically conductive derivative upon oxidation, e.g., with bromine to give , where x ~0.05.

In contrast to linear chain compounds, extended metal atom chains (EMACs) are molecules or ions that consist of a finite, often short, linear strings of metal atoms, surrounded by organic ligands.

These may be able to be used as vapochromic sensor materials, or materials which change color when exposed to different vapors.

Linear chains of Pd-Pd bonds protected by a "π-electron sheath" are known.

Not only do these olefin-stabilized metal chains constitute a significant contribution to the field of organometallic chemistry, both the complex's metal atom structures and the olefin ligands themselves can conduct a current.

Methodology
Some linear chain compounds are produced or fabricated by electrocrystallization. The technique is used to obtain single crystals of low-dimensional electrical conductors.

See also
platinum pop

References

Nanotechnology
Conductive polymers
Molecular electronics
Semiconductor material types